Nikki for Girls was a DC Thomson British girls' comic which lasted for 237 issues, between 23 February 1985 and 2 September 1989. It is most notable for the strip The Comp, which continued in Bunty after Nikki folded.

Strips 
 The Comp — set in a co-educational comprehensive school known as Redvale. Moved to Bunty after Nikki folded.
 Don't Be So Clever, Katy!
 Girl Talk
 Just the Two of Us
 Photo Finish
 Reach for the Stars
 School for the Forgotten
 The School on Sinister Street
 The Secret Piano
 Spotty
 Star Wars
 Tom Came Too

External links
 

DC Thomson Comics titles
1985 comics debuts
1989 comics endings
British girls' comics
Comics magazines published in the United Kingdom